William Mason (1719 – 29 September 1791) was a Calvinist writer.

Mason was born in Rotherhithe.  He wrote a number of very popular Christian books, and was twice briefly editor of The Gospel Magazine, immediately before and immediately after Augustus Montague Toplady.

Selected published writings
 A Spiritual Treasury for the Children of God or Read full text on Google Books
 The Christian Communicant
 A commentary on Bunyan's The Pilgrim's Progress, printed as footnotes in some copies of the same as "Mason's Notes".
 The Believer's Pocket Companion

References

 Hatfield, Edwin Francis.  The Poets of the Church, New York, 1884, pages 412–414 

1719 births
1791 deaths
English Calvinist and Reformed Christians
Anglican writers
People from Rotherhithe
18th-century English writers